The 1991 Tirreno–Adriatico was the 26th edition of the Tirreno–Adriatico cycle race and was held from 13 March to 20 March 1991. The race started in Pompei and finished in San Benedetto del Tronto. The race was won by Herminio Díaz Zabala of the ONCE team.

General classification

References

1991
1991 in Italian sport